Myripnois is a genus of Chinese flowering plants in the family Asteraceae. It is dioecious, with male and female flowers borne on separate plants.

Species
There is only one known species, Myripnois dioica, native to China (Hebei, Shaanxi, Shandong, Hubei, Henan, Heilongjiang, Jilin, Liaoning).

References

Pertyoideae
Endemic flora of China
Monotypic Asteraceae genera
Dioecious plants
Taxa named by Alexander von Bunge